Giuseppe Ayala  (born May 18, 1945 in Caltanissetta) is an Italian politician and magistrate.

He was known as an "anti-mafia" magistrate, and served as "anti-Mafia" judge. He raised doubts about whether it was only the Mafia that was involved in the killing of Giovanni Falcone.

In 1993 he published a book entitled La guerra dei giusti: I giudici, la mafia, la politica (The war of the righteous: The judges, the mafia, politics), detailing his experiences in politics and his encounters with the mafia.

Biography
Ayala graduated in law at the University of Palermo and worked as a substitute public prosecutor for the Republic, assisting the "anti-mafia pool" for several years. He was a public prosecutor at the first maxiprocess, later becoming Councilor of Cassation. He was elected to the Chamber of Deputies in 1992, shortly before the murder of Giovanni Falcone and Paolo Borsellino (magistrates of the anti-mafia pool with which Ayala had been interlocutor at the Public Prosecutor's Office), becoming a deputy in the ranks of the Italian Republican Party (PRI).

Following Tangentopoli, and the PRI crisis, Ayala joined the Democratic Alliance (AD), confirming the seat in the Chamber of Deputies in 1994. After the dissolution of AD he joined the Democratic Union (UD) of Antonio Maccanico, with which he was elected to the Senate in 1996. In 1998 he enrolled in the Democrats of the Left (DS), party with which he was elected senator in 2001 until 2006.

He served as Undersecretary to the Ministry of Justice from 1996 to 2000, in the Prodi I government and in the D'Alema I and II governments.

After 2006, he returned to the judiciary as a councilor of a civil section at the Court of Appeal of L'Aquila (2006 – 2011). He has been retired since December 2011.

References

External links 
 Official homepage of Giuseppe Ayala (in Italian)

1945 births
Living people
People from Caltanissetta
University of Palermo alumni
Italian Republican Party politicians
Democratic Alliance (Italy) politicians
Democratic Union (Italy) politicians
Democrats of the Left politicians
Deputies of Legislature XI of Italy
Deputies of Legislature XII of Italy
Senators of Legislature XIII of Italy
Senators of Legislature XIV of Italy
Politicians from the Province of Caltanissetta
20th-century Italian judges
Jurists from Sicily